Western Heights College is a secondary school in Hamlyn Heights, Geelong, Australia. Also known as Western Heights Community College, it is situated in Vines Road with  its  adjoining  campus  being the  Vines Road Community Centre. The college is spread across three buildings, with Year 7 and 8 in the red building, Year 9 and 10 in the grey building and Year 11 and 12 in the yellow building. As of 2016, the school has 605 students, with only 204 being girls and 401 boys. The school currently has a lower than average Index of Community Socio-Educational Advantage (ICSEA) score of 950.

History
The  Vines Road  Community  Centre was established in 1984. For some time, Western  Heights  College had three campuses: the Junior Years Campus (formerly Minerva campus and Barton Campus) for years 7, 8 and 9, and 10. the Senior Years Campus (formerly Quamby Campus) for years, 11 and 12, located in the suburbs of Herne Hill and Hamlyn Heights respectively. By  1985, the  college  had  been  created from the merger of two existing secondary schools: Geelong West Technical School, in Minerva Road, and Bell Park High School, in Quamby Avenue.
 
In 2010, the City of Greater Geelong (COGG) appointed landscape architects Capacity Consulting to "develop a Master Plan for Hamlyn Park Recreation Reserve which incorporated new facilities at  the Vines Road Education Redevelopment  Project - incorporating Western Heights College". The new facilities included sports grounds and netball courts with Stage 2 including a basketball stadium.

In 2011, the school began relocating to a single location on Vines Road, formerly the site of the Department of Human Services Barwon South Western Regional Office and, before that, the Geelong Teachers' College. The Barton campus closed at the end of the 2008, and the completion of stage one allowed Years 7 to 9 to start school at the new site at the beginning of July 2011.

Community  College
The  college  has  pioneered  "learning  communities" of  100-120  students  and there  are  no traditional  arrangements of classrooms with 25 students and one teacher. These communities can operate independently. Shared community facilities   feature in  the school and are open to the public. These  facilities  include: Community Library, Vines Road Community Centre itself, Seniors Club, Sporting facilities and a central Civic Plaza.  These facilities  are  owned  and  co-managed   by  the City  of  Greater Geelong in  conjunction  with  the  college's  management.  Various courses  and programs are  offered to  students and the  community on  a  fee-paying  basis.

Western  Heights  College/Vines  Road  Community  Centre experienced  severe  flooding  in  2016.

References

External links
College website

Public high schools in Victoria (Australia)